Gabrovica pri Komnu is a village in the Municipality of Komen in the Littoral region of Slovenia.

Church

The parish church in the settlement is dedicated to Saint Peter and belongs to the Diocese of Koper. It was built in the Baroque style. A plaque over the door has the year 1780 on it.

References

External links

Gabrovica pri Komnu on Geopedia

Populated places in the Municipality of Komen